This is a list of families in the phylum Basidiomycota of kingdom Fungi. The Basidiomycota are the second largest phyla of the fungi, containing 31515 species. The phylum is divided into three subphyla, the Pucciniomycotina (rust fungi), the Ustilaginomycotina (smut fungi), the Agaricomycotina, and two classes of uncertain taxonomic status (incertae sedis), the Wallemiomycetes and the  Entorrhizomycetes. The Agaricomycotina are a diverse group that contain mushrooms, bracket fungi, puffballs, jelly fungi, and coral fungi.

References 

 List of